George Gilbert Gutteres (11 October 1859 — 2 March 1898) was an English first-class cricketer and clergyman.

The son of George Gutteres, he was born at Kensington in October 1859. He was educated at Winchester College, before matriculating to Oriel College, Oxford. While studying at Oxford, Gutteres made two appearances in first-class cricket for Oxford University Cricket Club in 1881 against the Gentlemen of England and the Old Oxonians, with both matches played at Oxford. The following year he made a single first-class appearance for Hampshire against Somerset at Taunton. He scored 111 runs in his three first-class matches, at an average of exactly 37.00 and a highest score of 34 not out. Outside of cricket, Gutteres was ordained as a deacon at Ely Cathedral in 1884, having attended the Ely Theological College prior to his ordination. He was appointed curate at St Paul's in Bedford in 1884, a post which he held until 1886 when he was appointed curate at St John's Church in Torquay. In 1892, he was appointed reverend at Plymtree until 1897, prior to becoming reverend of Carlton Colville in Suffolk. Gutteres died in French Algeria at Algiers from influenza in March 1898.

References

External links

1859 births
1898 deaths
Sportspeople from Kensington
Cricketers from Greater London
People educated at Winchester College
Alumni of Oriel College, Oxford
English cricketers
Oxford University cricketers
Hampshire cricketers
19th-century English Anglican priests
Deaths from influenza